Res Publica is a quarterly peer-reviewed academic journal of moral, legal, social, and political philosophy. It was established in 1995 and is published by Springer Science+Business Media. The editors-in-chief are Sune Lægaard (Roskilde University) and Clare Chambers (Jesus College, Cambridge). It is the official journal of the Association for Social and Political Philosophy (formerly the Association for Legal and Social Philosophy).

Abstracting and indexing 
The journal is abstracted and indexed in Scopus, Academic OneFile, Index to Foreign Legal Periodicals, International Bibliography of Periodical Literature, International Political Science Abstracts, and The Philosopher's Index.

External links 
 
 Association for Social and Political Philosophy

Political philosophy journals
Ethics journals
Springer Science+Business Media academic journals
Quarterly journals
English-language journals
Law and morality
Law journals
Publications established in 1995
Political philosophy literature
Social philosophy journals
Academic journals associated with learned and professional societies